The 1915 Massachusetts gubernatorial election took place on November 2, 1915. The Republican nominee, Samuel W. McCall defeated the incumbent Democratic Governor David I. Walsh, with 46.97% of the vote.

Primary elections took place on September 21, 1915.

Democratic primary

Governor

Candidates
Frederick Simpson Deitrick, former U.S. Representative from Cambridge
David I. Walsh, incumbent Governor

Results

Lieutenant Governor

Candidates
Edward P. Barry, former Lieutenant Governor

Results

Republican primary

Governor

Candidates
Grafton D. Cushing, incumbent Lieutenant Governor
Eugene Foss, former Governor
Samuel W. McCall, former U.S. Representative from Winchester and nominee for Governor in 1914

Results

Lieutenant Governor

Candidates
Calvin Coolidge, President of the Massachusetts Senate
Guy Andrews Ham, former Governor's Councilor

Results

Progressive primary

Governor

Candidates
Nelson B. Clark, of Beverly

Results

General election

Candidates
Nelson B. Clark (Progressive)
Walter S. Hutchins, former candidate for Massachusetts's 1st congressional district (Socialist)
Samuel W. McCall, former U.S. Representative from Winchester (Republican)
Peter O'Rourke, candidate for Lieutenant Governor in 1913 (Socialist Labor)
William Shaw (Prohibition)
David I. Walsh, incumbent Governor (Democratic)

Results

Governor

Lieutenant Governor

See also
 1915 Massachusetts legislature

References

Bibliography

Governor
1915
Massachusetts
November 1915 events